Jozef P. A. "Jos" Chabert (16 March 1933 – 9 April 2014) was a Belgian politician born in Etterbeek. He lived the majority of his live in Meise, Belgium. Chabert died on 9 April 2014 in Brussels.

Political career 
Chabert was 24 years Minister, among others, Belgian Minister of Culture, Transport and Public Works:
 1973 – 1974 Minister of Culture
 1974 – 1980 Minister of Transport
 1980 – 1981 Minister of Openbare Werken
Chabert began his political career in 1965 as Alderman in Meise. He began his political career as a councillor and alderman of Meise in 1965. In 1968 he was elected Member of Parliament. In 1973 he was appointed Minister of Dutch and Flemish cultural affairs in the Belgian Government Leburton. Barely a year later he became Minister of Transport, Communications & Energy. A position he would eventually carry six years. It is in this era of policy making, Chabert realised his greatest achievements. He is the founder of the speed limit to 120 kilometres per hour, the alcohol limit to 0.8‰ and the mandatory seat belt. Afterwards he was still Deputy Prime Minister and Minister of Public Works.

From 1974, he is known for "Route Chabert" imposing flights departing from Brussels National Airport to avoid the area of Meise where he used to live. The deviation still exists, affecting the health and security of hundred of thousand of people living in Brussels.

Early 1982 Chabert disappeared from the federal government scene, looking for another challenge. He became Belgian representative at the United Nations General Assembly and later Belgian Commissioner General for World Expo in Tsukuba in Japan.

At the end of the 80s, Chabert returned to politics. He stood in the front row when the Brussels-Capital Region was held over the baptismal font. He was a long-time Minister for the Budget, Economy and Finance. In 1999 he became Minister of Public Works & Transport. Since the Christian Democrats (CD&V) at that time from the Flemish and federal government were barred due to the dioxin crisis, Chabert was for five years the only CD&V-minister in Belgium, unique.

Honours 
 Minister of State, by Royal Decree.
 Knight Grand Cross in the Order of the Crown.
 Grand Officer in the Order of Leopold.
 Knight Grand Cross in the Order of Merit of the Italian Republic.
 Knight Grand Cross in the Order of Merit of the Federal Republic of Germany.
 Knight Grand Cross in the Order of the Sacred Treasure.

References

External links
 
 Jos Chabert in ODIS - Online Database for Intermediary Structures 
 Archives of Jos Chabert in ODIS - Online Database for Intermediary Structures 

1933 births
2014 deaths
Belgian Ministers of State
Politicians from Brussels
Grand Crosses of the Order of the Crown (Belgium)
Grand Crosses with Star and Sash of the Order of Merit of the Federal Republic of Germany
21st-century Belgian politicians
Presidents of the European Committee of the Regions